An atomic veteran is a veteran who was exposed to ionizing radiation while present in the site of a nuclear explosion during their active duty. The U.S. Department of Veterans Affairs defines an atomic veteran "who, as part of his or her military service: Participated in an above-ground nuclear test, 1945–1962; or was part of the U.S. military occupation forces in/around Hiroshima/Nagasaki before 1946; or was held as a POW in or near Hiroshima or Nagasaki (certain cases)."

Atomic veterans also includes service personnel from other nations, including the United Kingdom, Australia, New Zealand, France, China, and Russia who were similarly exposed during their active service.

United States

Recognition 
On July 15, 2021, President Joe Biden declared July 16, 2021 as "National Atomic Veterans Day" via presidential proclamation.

Affected veterans
The Defense Threat Reduction Agency's Nuclear Test Personnel Review has maintained a database of participants and radiation dose reconstructions since 1978. Dose reconstructions are used by the United States Department of Veterans Affairs (VA) to evaluate and decide veterans' claims filed under the provisions of Public Law (PL) 98-542 and implementing regulations in Title 38 of the Code of Federal Regulations, part 3.311.

John Smitherman (1928-1983), was a navy sailor involved in the 1946 Bikini Atoll nuclear explosions, which resulted in extensive radioactive contamination of the area. Cancer of the lymphatic system, and two leg amputations, resulted for Smitherman, who became president of the National Association of Atomic Veterans. Smitherman featured in Robert Stone's documentary film Radio Bikini, which was nominated for an Academy Award in 1988.

Investigation 

A formal investigation of the radiation exposure these veterans received, as well as radiation experiments conducted on humans, was initiated in 1994, by former President Bill Clinton, who apologized for their treatment in 1995. "In 1996, the U.S. Congress repealed the Nuclear Radiation Secrecy Agreement Act, which rescinded the Atomic Veteran “oath-of-secrecy”, thus allowing Atomic-Veterans the opportunity to recount stories of their participation in Nuclear weapon testing and post test event activities, without legal penalty. By this time, however, many thousands of Atomic Veterans, the majority of whom were afflicted with a host of radiation induced health issues, such as cancer, had taken that “secret” with them, to their graves.

The remaining atomic veterans may receive special priority enrollment for health care services from VA for radiation-related conditions. In addition, atomic veterans are eligible to participate in an ionizing radiation registry examination program operated by VA.

The only copies of service and medical records for many of these veterans were lost in a fire at the National Archives in 1973. Veterans, or families of deceased Veterans, whose records were lost in the fire, were denied these services and must go through an extensive reconstruction process in order to establish their presence during the time of atmospheric tests.

Compensation 
The United States Department of Justice (DOJ) has a different compensation program established by the Radiation Exposure Compensation Act (RECA) which was passed by the United States Congress on October 5, 1990, and signed into law by President George H. W. Bush on October 15. Atomic veterans who participated in atmospheric nuclear tests may be eligible.

The Radiation Exposure Compensation Act was amended in 2013 and enlarged the geographic exposure area and the amount of compensation payable to Atomic Veterans and people living downwind of the tests. Other compensation may also be available from the United States Department of Labor under section SEC of the Energy Employees Occupational Illness Compensation Program.

Epidemiological studies of atomic veterans have shown exposure to radiation to be associated with a number of disorders including leukemia, various cancers and cataracts. It has been determined that studies on the children of atomic veterans, however, face "insurmountable" difficulties.

France 

A cohort of workers who were exposed during the French nuclear weapons test program at Moruroa Atoll in the Pacific are represented by Association Moruroa E Tatou. The organization has been critical of the French government's initial denial of harm, and limited commitment to compensation to total value of $13.5 million. The president of Association Moruroa E Tatou estimates that between 15,000 and 30,000 people worked on the test program, but the official number remains a national secret.

Australia 
Australian servicemen supported British nuclear weapons test programs at Emu Field, Maralinga, the Montebello Islands and Kiritimati (then called Christmas Island) during period 1952-1963. Associations representing Australian atomic veterans include the Australian Nuclear Veterans Association. and the Australian Ex-Servicemen Atomic Survivors Association.

Compensation 
The Clarke Review of Veterans Entitlements considered the compensation of Australian atomic veterans in 2003. Since 2010, Australian Defence Force personnel who participated in the British nuclear tests have been eligible for compensation and health care benefits for medical conditions that relate to their service. Widows and widowers of deceased servicemen and women are also eligible for benefits if their partner's death is related to that service. A ‘reasonable hypothesis’ standard of proof is applied to all claims lodged.

China 
More than 100,000 troops of China were sent into the deserts of Xinjiang Uyghur Autonomous Region to provide the labor at the test sites for China's first atomic bombs. A number of these troops later developed serious medical problems.

See also
 Atomic bomb
 Downwinders
 Hibakusha
 Human experimentation in the United States
 Human radiation experiments

References

External links 
 National Association of Atomic Veterans
 Veterans Advisory Board on Dose Reconstruction
 Office of Public Health: Military Exposures, Radiation - U.S. Department of Veterans Affairs
 A collection of facts and stories from Atomic Veterans relating their experiences in 1958 during Operation Hardtack 1. 
 Atomic Veterans records, 1947-89, a collection held by Tufts Digital Collections and Archives
 
 
 America's Atomic Vets by Jennifer LaFleur with Reveal from The Center for Investigative Reporting
 Atomic Vets a short documentary by Retro Report.

Nuclear weapon safety
Veterans' affairs in Australia
Veterans' affairs in France
Veterans' affairs in Russia
Veterans' affairs in the United Kingdom
Veterans' affairs in the United States